Gramps is an informal synonym for a male grandparent. 

Gramp or Gramps, may also refer to:

People
 Gramps, nickname of Guy Chouinard (born 1956), Canadian retired National Hockey League player
 Gramps, nickname of Tony Yates (born 1937), American retired college basketball player and coach
 Gramps Morgan, (born 1976), Jamaican reggae singer and musician
 Baby Gramps, American guitar performer famous for his palindromes
 Johann Gramp (1819–1903), Bavarian-born Australian winemaker and politician

Fictional characters
 George "Gramps" Miller, a character in the TV series Lassie
 Gramps, a character in advertisements for Cocoa Puffs
 Gramp, a fictional character from the film The Boy with Green Hair
 Gramp, a fictional character from the film Happy Land

Other uses
 Gramps (software) (formerly GRAMPS, Genealogical Research and Analysis Management Programming System), genealogy software
 Gramps, a 1995 television movie starring Andy Griffith

See also

 
 
 
 Gran (disambiguation)
 Grandpa (disambiguation)

Lists of people by nickname